Amphidiscella lecus is a species of sea sponge first found at the bottom of shelf, canyon and seamounts of the west coast of Washington, British Columbia and the Gulf of Alaska.

References

Hexactinellida
Animals described in 2014